Natta is a spider genus.

Natta may also refer to:
 29347 Natta, a minor planet
 Nata (raga) raga, a musical scale of Carnatic music
 Natta, Benin

People with the surname
 Camille Natta (born 1977), French actress
 Giulio Natta (1903–1979), Italian chemist and Nobel laureate
 Alessandro Natta (1918–2001), Italian politician

See also

Netta (disambiguation)